Le prince troubadour, ou Le grand trompeur des dames (The Troubadour Prince, or The Great Deceiver of Ladies) is an opera by the French composer Étienne Méhul. It takes the form of an opéra comique in one act. It premiered at the Opéra-Comique, Paris on 24 May 1813. The libretto is by Alexandre Duval. The work was not a great success and only enjoyed 13 performances in 1813. According to Arthur Pougin, its failure contributed to Méhul's growing depression and his sense that he was the victim of a conspiracy by his enemies.

Roles

References

Sources
Printed score: Le Prince Troubadour//Opéra-comique en un Acte//Paroles//de Mr. Alexandre Duval//Membre de l'Institut//Musique//de Mr. Méhul//Membre de l'Institut, Paris, Frey, s.d. (accessible for free onlite at Gallica - B.N.F.
Adélaïde de Place Étienne Nicolas Méhul (Bleu Nuit Éditeur, 2005)
Arthur Pougin Méhul: sa vie, son génie, son caractère (Fischbacher, 1889)
General introduction to Méhul's operas in the  introduction to the edition of Stratonice by M. Elizabeth C. Bartlet (Pendragon Press, 1997)

Operas by Étienne Méhul
1813 operas
Opéras comiques
French-language operas
Operas
One-act operas
Opera world premieres at the Opéra-Comique